In chess, the Sicilian Defence, Alapin Variation is a response to the Sicilian Defence characterised by the moves:
1. e4 c5
2. c3

It is named after the Russian master Semyon Alapin (1856–1923). For many years, it was not held in high regard, since 2...d5 was thought to allow Black easy .

Today, the Alapin is considered to be one of the most  and respectable , and it is championed by grandmasters such as Evgeny Sveshnikov, Eduardas Rozentalis, Sergei Tiviakov, Duško Pavasovič, and Dražen Sermek. It has been played by World Champions Viswanathan Anand, Garry Kasparov, Anatoly Karpov, Veselin Topalov, and Vladimir Kramnik, and Deep Blue played the Alapin Variation against Kasparov in their 1996 match.

The Alapin is also seen in deferred form, particularly when Black chooses an unusual second move after 2.Nf3. For example, after 2.Nf3 a6 or 2.Nf3 Qc7, 3.c3 is often seen, since neither ...a6 nor ...Qc7 are particularly useful moves against the Alapin.

Main variations

2...Nf6

The main line in current practice is 2...Nf6 3.e5 Nd5 and can also arise if Black declines the Smith–Morra Gambit (1.e4 c5 2.d4 cxd4 3.c3 Nf6 4.e5 Nd5).

White has a number of options including 4.d4, 4.Nf3, 4.g3 and 4.Bc4.

2...d5

This is the main alternative to 2...Nf6 for Black. The usual continuation is 3.exd5 Qxd5, a line known as the Barmen Defense. 3.e5 may transpose to the Advance Variation of the French Defence if Black responds with 3...e6, but Black can also develop his c8-bishop before playing e6. This leads to a favorable version of the French for Black, since the bishop is no longer hemmed in by the pawn chain. If White plays 3.exd5, 3...Nf6 is possible, but it is not clear whether Black receives sufficient compensation for the pawn.

The main options revolve around: 
4.d4 Nc6 and now 5.dxc5 or 5.Nf3
4.d4 Nf6 5.Nf3 when after both 5...e6 and 5...Bg4 White can try a number of different moves.

2...e6

This is Black's most solid response, preparing 3...d5. It is closely related to the French Defence, to which it often transposes. White can transpose to the Advance Variation of the French Defence with 3.d4 d5 4.e5. Alternatively, White can transpose to a sort of Tarrasch French with 3.d4 d5 4.Nd2, or try to demonstrate a slight advantage with 3.d4 d5 4.exd5 exd5 5.Be3.

2...d6

This is a  response. Black often offers a gambit with 3.d4 Nf6 4.dxc5 Nc6 (4...Nxe4?? 5.Qa4+) 5.cxd6 Nxe4.

Other tries

2...e5

This move makes it hard for White to play d4, but seriously weakens the d5-square. Play usually continues 3.Nf3 Nc6 4.Bc4, with a solid  for White.

See also
 List of chess openings
 List of chess openings named after people

Notes

References
Rozentalis, Eduardas and Harley, Andrew, Play the 2.c3 Sicilian (UK: Gambit Publications 2002)

Further reading

External links

Chess openings Sicilian, Alapin (B22)
An Interesting Idea in the Alapin Sicilian

Chess openings